The Uganda Police Band is the sole ensemble of the Uganda Police and the mandated police band of the Republic of Uganda, being stationed in Kampala. It is responsible for playing at police ceremonies and community events. It was founded in the mid-1960s following Ugandan independence. In September 2019, it launched its first affiliated police band in the Lango sub-region.

One of the more notable band members was Moses Matovu, who joined in 1968 and went on to found the Afrigo Band. Venancio Okello was the longest  serving director of the band, serving until his death in 2002. On 11 January 2019, the 8-year director of the band Josephine Kakooza (nicknamed Mama Police) died while in service, being the longest serving officer in the UPF at the time of her death (having 50 years of service attributed to her).

References 

Ugandan music
Police bands